The 1859 Grand National was the 21st renewal of the Grand National horse race that took place at Aintree near Liverpool, England, on 2 March 1859.

Finishing Order

Non-finishers

References

 1859
Grand National
Grand National
19th century in Lancashire
March 1859 sports events